Carlos Diegues, also known as Cacá Diegues (born May 19, 1940), is a Brazilian film director. He was born in Maceió, Alagoas, and is best known as a member of the Cinema Novo movement. He is popularly known for his unconventional, yet intriguing film techniques among other film producers of the Cinema Novo movement. Diegues is also widely known for his dynamic use visuals, ideas, plots, themes, and other cinematic techniques. He incorporated many musical acts in his film as he favored musical pieces to be complementary of his ideas. Diegues remains very popular and is regarded as one of the most cinematic producers of his generation.  Of the Cinema Novo directors, he would go on to produce films, plays, musicals and other forms of entertainment in Brazil.

Diegues' contributions to Brazilian cinema developed the film industry. He would pioneer expensive film projects that domestic filmmakers had ever seen. Films such as Bye Bye Brazil were two million dollar projects and later on films such as God is Brazilian  would be over 10 million dollars. This was a new era in Brazil as domestic directors had yet to produce any films with that kind of financial support. He admits to using Brazilians in his films as much as he can. Diegues would use extras, film technicians, painters, sculptors and other essential personnel of Brazilian backgrounds even if they were inexperienced. Diegues attempted to consistently represent the underrepresented people of Brazil in his films. He suggests that history is written by the winners and the afro-Brazilian communities were not among those who were given a chance to write their own history. He also proposed the idea that up until this movement, cinema in Brazil only provided the white Brazilian experience despite the growing masses of black Brazilians all over the country. He is known for distinguished publications that uplift the Afro-Brazilian spirit and bodies.

In 2018, Diegues was elected to the Brazilian Academy of Letters.

Personal life

Carlos Diegues attended the Ponificia Universidade Católica in Rio de Janeiro. In 1959 he began his legal studies at the university. 
A university engaged with political affairs, Diegeus emerged himself in political activism through the Juventude Universitária Católica (Catholic Youth Movement) and the Centros Populares de Cultura (Popular Cultural Centers) (CPC). As a left leaning student, he pursued filmmaking as he applied his deep understand of social criticism in his works. or CPCs, both originating in leftist student politics. In the CPCs Diegues started his career as a filmmaker.

Diegeus later went on to become an integral participant of the Cinco Vezes Favela and produced the episode Escola de Samba: Alegría de vivir in 1962. Doing so, he criticized the Carnival and suggested workers should unionize and demand workers rights. 
His work painted a bleak picture of what was the reality. Depicting landlords and leaders in charge as figures who upheld an inequitable world. His film sparked mixed emotions, but most importantly, it gave the working masses hope for change. This was the beginning of an era in film known as Cinema Novo. In the 60s the films associated with Cinema Novo explicitly talked about the unfair treatment of people under the current status quo. The leftist ideas by filmmakers like Diegues and other important figures would allow the Cinema Novo to flourish.

As the dictatorship reached full force in the late 1960s the CPC could no longer operate as regularly for the members. As a result, Diegues and other filmmakers were forced to redirect the paths of their careers. In his earliest works Diegues created Joana Francesa by 1975, when the dictatorship repressed and censored most of the media and entertainment industries. This film alluded to the ideas of inequality and injustice but it also garnered criticism by the left as they suggested it was not as intricate or heavily influenced by the social commentary Diegues had used before. After the regime's collapse Diegues returned to a more explicit approach he was once heavily praised for, however, he still produced films during the repression that garnered international attention such as Bye Bye Brazil.

Filmography

References

External links
 Official Site

The New York Times Bio
 

1940 births
Pontifical Catholic University of Rio de Janeiro alumni
Living people
Brazilian film directors
Brazilian screenwriters
People from Maceió